Umlazi is a township in KwaZulu-Natal, South Africa, located south-west of Durban. Organisationally and administratively it forms part of the eThekwini Metropolitan Municipality and its South Municipal Planning Region. 

It is the fourth largest township in South Africa, after Soweto, Tembisa and Katlehong. Umlazi is the only township in the country that has its own registration plate, which is NUZ. It is divided into 26 sections, A through to Z, with the exception of I, O and X, but with an addition of AA, BB and CC.

Etymology
According to legend, the name Umlazi comes from "umlaza", the Zulu word for the sour acid produced from fermented or sour milk. It is believed that when King Shaka was passing through the area, he refused to drink from a local river claiming it had the taste of "umlaza". The area was called Umlazi after this incident.

Geography 

Umlazi is situated on a series of undulating hills at an average elevation of 101 metres above sea level between the uMlaza River to the north and the uMbokodweni River to the south. Another river running through Umlazi is the Siphingo River which also runs towards the south of the township.

Umlazi is located approximately 15 km south-east of Durban and is bordered by Chatsworth to the north, the city of Durban to the north-east (excluding Isipingo and Prospecton), the defunct Durban International Airport and Isipingo to the east, Malukazi to the south-east, eZimbokodweni and Golokodo to the south and Esidweni, Inwabi and Ehlanzeni to the east.

Infrastructure

Umlazi, like many townships in the urban areas of Cape Town, Port Elizabeth, Durban, and Johannesburg, is witnessing increased private and government investments, as seen in the construction of new shopping complexes, primary and secondary schools, universities of technology and libraries.

The new educational infrastructure is particularly , as an affordable, easily accessible quality secondary education is valuable for many children in Umlazi, particularly with regards to their search for employment following school. Most young residents do not attend tertiary institutions due to their family's limited financial resources.

There are now three shopping malls in Umlazi, the Mega-Philani Shopping Centre, Kwa-Mnyandu Shopping Centre and Umlazi Mega City Mall which is located just off the freeway that exits to Umlazi. The recently built KwaMnyandu Shopping Centre opened its doors on 5 June 2014.

Almost all sections in Umlazi have a clinic and a police station. The King Zwelithini Stadium, which is located on the Griffiths Mxenge Highway, has been revamped for the 2010 FIFA World Cup it is home to AmaZulu FC football club that is based in and around Umlazi.

Education

Umlazi has two FET Colleges, Umlazi Coastal College V and BB Campuses, which are the equivalent of American Community Colleges, and a university, Mangosuthu University of Technology. There are schools that produce 100% Matric (Grade 12) pass rate, including Ogwini Comprehensive Technical High School Umlazi Comprehensive Technical High School (ComTech), Menzi High School, Velabahleke High School, Zwelibanzi High School and Qhilika High School. About 30% of homes in Umlazi are informal settlements (tin and wooden shacks). Most of these informal settlements have been demolished and replaced with brand new homes and roads that are part of the Residential Development Project (RDP).

Transport

Roads 

Umlazi is served by its main artery road, the M30 Griffiths Mxenge Highway (previously Mangosuthu Highway) which begins at the intersection with the R102 South Coast Road near Umlazi Mega City and ends at the intersection with the R603 Umbumbulu Road in uMbumbulu.

The Umlazi area is also served by a number of other arterial routes such as the N2, M4 and R102.  

The N2 Outer Ring Road which bypasses the township to the east and links Umlazi to KwaDukuza in the north-east and Amanzimtoti and Port Shepstone in the south-west. Access to Umlazi from the N2 can be obtained through the R102 South Coast Road interchange (Exit 152) for southbound motorists and the R102 Prospecton Road interchange (Exit 149) in Prospecton for northbound motorists. 

The R102 South Coast Road is a regional route that bypasses Umlazi to the east and links the township to Durban in the north-east and Reunion, Isipingo and Prospecton, Amanzimtoti and Kingsburgh in the south-east.

The M4 Inkosi Albert Luthuli Freeway (previously Southern Freeway) is a metropolitan highway that begins at the interchange with the N2 and R102 in the Reunion area (towards the east of the Umlazi) and links the township directly to Durban's city centre in the north-east. 

The M35 Sipho Mkhize Drive is a metropolitan route that passes through a very small section of Umlazi in the Umlazi V and Z sections in the south of the township and links this part of Umlazi to Lotus Park in the south-east and Folweni to the south-west.

Notable people
 Samke Makhoba, Actress
 Khanyi Dhlomo
 Griffiths Mxenge (anti-apartheid activist)
 Victoria Mxenge (anti-apartheid activist)
 Senzo Meyiwa (Soccer player)
 Baby Cele (Actress)
 Khaya Mthethwa (Singer & Pastor)
 Brilliant Khuzwayo (Soccer player)
 Big Nuz (Music group)
 Zanele Muholi (Artist and visual activist)
 Black Coffee 
 Okmalumkoolkat (Musician & producer)
 Sifiso Mzobe (Author)
 Siyabonga Shibe (Actor)
 Linda Sikhakhane (Saxophonist and composer)
 Sifiso Mzobe (Author)
 Linda Sokhulu (Actress)
 Japhet Zwane (Soccer player)
 Andile Khumalo (Composer and a music lecturer)
Promise Mthembu (HIV/AIDS activist)

References

External links
Umlazi Online
BBC Radio 5 Live's Umlazi project
Map showing Umlazi
A short documentary following Lucas back to his home town in Umlazi Township

Townships in KwaZulu-Natal
Suburbs of Durban